Șerban Ciochină (born November 30, 1939 in Bucharest) is a retired Romanian triple jump athlete. He achieved 5th place at the 1964 Summer Olympics, and won the Romanian triple jump championship six years in a row from 1963 to 1968. He was also European Champion in Dortmund, Germany in 1966.

References 
 Şerban Ciochină

1939 births
Living people
Sportspeople from Bucharest
Romanian male triple jumpers
Athletes (track and field) at the 1964 Summer Olympics
Athletes (track and field) at the 1968 Summer Olympics
Olympic athletes of Romania